Fong She-mei is a writer, publisher and journalist in Hong Kong. Her real name is Wong Ling.

Education 
Fong graduated from Hong Kong Shue Yan College. In 1991, she received a master's degree from Lancaster University.

Career 
A journalist and newspaper editor, Fong in 1998 co-founded Century Culture Ltd, a publisher of books and magazines, in Hong Kong. As an author, her works include Love of City, Tomorrow is Always Waiting There, and Find the Feeling of Happiness. She has also written such articles as "Life with Deducting 365 Days", "The Years of Monmouth Path", and others.

In 2004, Fong began writing children's literature, including the White Cat Black Cat series. Her success earned her a Ming Pao interview in 2012.

Works

Prose
Love of Cities
Butterfly's Wing
Tomorrow is Always Waiting There
Find the Feeling of Happiness
Buddhism Changes Our Lives

White Cat Black Cat Series
Detective Cat Series
Chinese History Journey Series
World Classics Theatre
The Blue Planet Series
Funny Liberal Study Series
School Detective Series
Funny Comic Strips Series

Awards

The Best Ten Books Election Award (Hong Kong Reading City) 
 9th Edition of Hong Kong Reading City, in 2011 : 3rd Prize, Funny Comic Strips Vol.42
 12th Edition of Hong Kong Reading City, in 2014 : 5th Prize, Mystery of Dinosaurs
 13th Edition of Hong Kong Reading City, in 2015 : 1st Prize, School Detective II
 13th Edition of Hong Kong Reading City, in 2015 : 4th Prize, Detective Cat  - Against the Sky
 14th Edition of Hong Kong Reading City, in 2016 : Best Ten Books, Detective Cat  - Capture the Vampire

The Best Ten Books Election is held by Hong Kong Reading City every year and is based on a trial reading system, with students choosing their favourite books and authors.

Hong Kong Publishing Biennial Awards 
 1st Edition of Hong Kong Publishing Biennial Awards, in 2017 : "Language Education" category Prize, Fun with Classical Chinese

Personal life 
Fong's husband is Ma Sing-yuen, a caricaturist.

References

Hong Kong writers
Living people
Year of birth missing (living people)
Alumni of Lancaster University